Doormat  may refer to:
 Mat, a piece of fabric material that is placed on a floor or other flat surface
 "Doormat", song by No Doubt on their 1992 album No Doubt
 "Doormat", song by Spazz on their 1994 album Dwarf Jester Rising
 John Doormat, main character of the eponymous 1950s cartoon series